Public Opinion was a British magazine that ran from 1861 to 1951. It was a weekly "review of current thought and activity", published in London by G. Cole. An 82 reel microfilm was published by the Library of Congress in 1972.

References

External links
 Public opinion selected issues from the 1860s, 1870s and 1920s at HathiTrust

1861 establishments in England
1951 disestablishments in England
News magazines published in the United Kingdom
Weekly magazines published in the United Kingdom
Defunct magazines published in the United Kingdom
Magazines published in London
Magazines established in 1861
Magazines disestablished in 1851